The IFFHS World's Best International Goal Scorer is a football award given annually since 1991 to the world's top international goalscorer in the calendar year. The award is given by the International Federation of Football History & Statistics (IFFHS).

Only international goals from 1 January to 31 December in international matches, Olympic tournaments, FIFA Club World Cup, official matches between the topical continental club champions, and the continental club competitions of FIFA, AFC, CAF, CONCACAF, CONMEBOL, OFC and UEFA, as well as, the continental Super Cup matches of the six confederations are taken into consideration. If the number of goals is equal, the player who scored more goals in international matches is ranked higher.

Cristiano Ronaldo holds the record for most wins (5), and most goals in a calendar year (32 in 2017). Dennis Bergkamp, Raí and César Obando won the award with the fewest goals (12 in 1992). Neymar and Gabriel Batistuta are the players with the most runner-up appearances (2). Cristiano Ronaldo is the player with most third place finishes (3). Ali Daei, Cristiano Ronaldo, Lionel Messi and Robert Lewandowski are the only players to have won the award more than once, with the later two being the only players to win the award in successive seasons, with the former achieving this twice. Ali Ashfaq scored the most goals without winning (23 goals in 2013). Real Madrid and Barcelona are tied for the clubs with the most wins (5).

In 2012, the IFFHS awarded the World's Best Goal Scorer of the First Decade, considering the years 2001 to 2010.

Men's winners

List of winners 

Notes:

Statistics

The World's Best Top International Goal Scorer of the First Decade (2001–2010)

The awards were part of the IFFHS World Football Gala 2012 which took place in Barcelona in May 2012.

For the final list of 15 players, international goals scored from 1 January 2001 to 31 December 2010 were taken into consideration.

Women's winners

List of winners

Statistics

See also
International Federation of Football History & Statistics
IFFHS World's Best Club
IFFHS World's Best Player
IFFHS World's Best Goalkeeper
IFFHS World's Best Top Goal Scorer
IFFHS World Team
IFFHS World's Best Club Coach
IFFHS World's Best National Coach

References

External links
 IFFHS official website

International Federation of Football History & Statistics
Association football trophies and awards
Association football player non-biographical articles